Lorenzo Archibeque Larrañaga (December 31, 1937 – October 9, 2018) was a Republican member of the New Mexico House of Representatives, representing the 27th District since 1995. He served on the House Agriculture and Water Resources committee, Appropriations and Finance committee and Rules and Order of Business committee.

He attended the University of New Mexico where he attained his masters and bachelor's degrees in engineering and civil engineering. He served in the United States Army. Larrañaga was the retired owner of a ranching company. He also worked as an engineer for the State of New Mexico in the highways department, also serving as Secretary of Highways in 1982. He was Deputy Chief Administrator for the City of Albuquerque from 1987 to 1988.
 
He lived in Albuquerque and was married with two children. Larrañaga resigned from the House of Representatives and his re-election campaign on October 1, 2018 due to health problems (probable Creutzfeldt-Jakob disease), and died just over a week later on October 9, 2018.

Lorenzo is a descendant of Cristoval Larrañaga, Military Surgeon.

References

External links
Representative Larry Larrañaga at the NM House website
Project Vote Smart - Representative Larry Larrañaga (NM) profile

Republican Party members of the New Mexico House of Representatives
1937 births
2018 deaths
Hispanic and Latino American state legislators in New Mexico
University of New Mexico alumni
People from Torrance County, New Mexico
Politicians from Albuquerque, New Mexico
Military personnel from New Mexico
American civil engineers
21st-century American politicians
Neurological disease deaths in New Mexico
Deaths from Creutzfeldt–Jakob disease